Purnima Sethi  (1954–2012)  was a leader of Bharatiya Janata Party from Delhi. She was elected to Delhi Legislative Assembly from  Kalkaji (Delhi Assembly constituency) and served as a minister in Government of Delhi in 1998.

References

State cabinet ministers of Delhi
Women members of the Delhi Legislative Assembly
1954 births
2012 deaths
Bharatiya Janata Party politicians from Delhi
20th-century Indian women politicians
20th-century Indian politicians
Women state cabinet ministers of India
Delhi MLAs 1993–1998